USS Elba (AG-132/AKL-3) was a Camano-class cargo ship constructed for the U.S. Army as USA FS-267 shortly before the end of  World War II and later acquired by the U.S. Navy in 1947. She was configured as a transport and cargo ship and was assigned to serve the World War II Trust Territories in the Pacific Ocean.

Built on Long Island, New York
Elba (AG-132) was built in 1944 by Wheeler Shipbuilding Corp., Whitestone, Long Island, New York, for the Army as FS-267; acquired by the Navy at Guam 14 March 1947; renamed and commissioned 3 July 1947. She was reclassified AKL-3, 31 March 1949.

Serving the Pacific Trust Territories
From her base at Guam, Elba, during her brief service, steadily carried passengers, mail, cargo and Government officials among the Caroline Islands, the Mariana Islands, the Marshall Islands, and the Palau Islands.

She operated under Commander, Service Division 51. With time out for two brief overhauls at Pearl Harbor, Elba faithfully served the administration of the Pacific Trust Territory in the Marianas, Carolines and Marshalls, even for a time after decommissioning 27 July 1951 at Guam.

Transferred to Department of the Interior 
She was transferred 29 January 1952 to the U.S. Department of the Interior. She was struck from the Navy List at an unknown date. She was sold in 1957 for commercial service and wrecked 6 August 1962.

References
 
 NavSource Online: Service Ship Photo Archive - FS-267 - AG-132 / AKL-3 Elba

 

Ships of the United States Army
Design 381 coastal freighters
Ships built in Queens, New York
1944 ships
World War II auxiliary ships of the United States
Camano-class cargo ships
United States Department of the Interior